True for You is the third studio album by Irish singer-songwriter Paul Brady, released in 1983 by Polydor Records. Neil Dorfsman and Brady produced the album

In 1999, a digitally remastered CD of the album was released by Rykodisc.

Critical reception
In a retrospective review for AllMusic, critic Rick Anderson wrote that "the songs have aged surprisingly well for an album of this vintage." Adding that "while the drum sound and synth parts scream 1980s, Brady's songcraft is pretty well timeless."

Track listing

Personnel
Credits are adapted from the True for You liner notes.

Musicians
 Paul Brady – lead and background vocals; acoustic and electric guitars; synthesizer; piano; mandolin
 Phil Palmer – acoustic, electric, twelve-string and slide guitars
 Betsy Cook – synthesizer; piano; Hammond organ 
 Jamie Lane – drums; percussion
 Dave Quinn – bass guitar
 John McKenzie – bass guitar 
 Mickey Feat – bass guitar
 Mel Collins – saxophone
 John Earle – baritone saxophone
 Ray Beavis – tenor saxophone
 Chris Gower – trombone
 Dick Hanson – trumpet
 Peter Veitch – synthesizer
 Neil Dorfsman – percussion
 Julian Diggle – percussion
 Richard Piper – backing vocals
 Sharon Campbell – backing vocals

Production
 Neil Dorfsman – producer; engineer; mixing
 Paul Brady – producer
 Steve Lipson – mixing on "The Great Pretender"

References

External links
 

1983 albums
Paul Brady albums
Polydor Records albums